Hendrella winnertzii is a species of tephritid or fruit flies in the genus Hendrella of the family Tephritidae.

Distribution
Ukraine to East Siberia, Mongolia, China.

References

Tephritinae
Insects described in 1864
Diptera of Asia